Georissa laevigata is a species of a land snail, a minute cave snail, gastropod mollusk in the family Hydrocenidae.

This species is endemic to Guam.

References

Hydrocenidae
Fauna of Guam
Cave snails
Molluscs of Oceania
Gastropods described in 1894
Taxonomy articles created by Polbot